Shureh-ye Pain (also Romanized as Shūreh-ye Pā’īn; also known as Shūrjeh Pā’īn and Shūrjeh-ye Soflá) is a village in Garakan Rural District, in the Central District of Ashtian County, Markazi Province, Iran. At the 2006 census, its population was 13, in 5 families.

References 

Populated places in Ashtian County